Verse-chorus-verse may refer to:

Verse-chorus form, a musical form common in popular music

Either of 2 songs by American rock band Nirvana, written by Kurt Cobain:

Verse Chorus Verse, a never-completed Nevermind outtake.
Sappy, removed at the last minute from In Utero and placed on No Alternative instead.
Verse Chorus Verse, an unreleased live album by the band, scheduled for release in late 1994.

 The Verse, the Chorus (2009), 1st album by the band Ivan & Alyosha
 VerseChorusVerse, the moniker of Northern Irish singer-songwriter Tony Wright